Thomas Pakenham, 2nd Earl of Longford,  (14 May 1774 – 28 May 1835), known as The Lord Longford between 1792 and 1794, was an Anglo-Irish peer.

Background

Pakenham was the eldest son of Edward Pakenham, 2nd Baron Longford, by Catherine Rowley, daughter of Hercules Rowley. His sister, the Honourable Catherine Pakenham, was the wife of the Duke of Wellington. Longford initially refused to allow them to marry, as the future Duke was then a penniless younger son with few prospects. One of his younger brothers was the Honourable Sir Edward Pakenham, a British Army officer who served under Wellington in the Peninsular War. A younger brother was Sir Hercules Robert Pakenham CB, KCB, a lieutenant-general of the British Army and was brevet colonel and aide-de-camp to the William IV of the United Kingdom.

Pakenham succeeded his father in the barony in 1792, inheriting Pakenham Hall (otherwise known as Tullynally Castle) and two years later also succeeded his grandmother, Elizabeth Pakenham, 1st Countess of Longford, as second Earl of Longford.

Public life
Longford was one of the original 28 Irish representative peers elected to the 1st Union Parliament on 2 August 1800. He had supported the Act of Union 1800, and like most of the Irish aristocracy had received a handsome financial inducement to do so. He was a member of the House of Lords until his death. He was appointed a Knight of the Order of St Patrick on 17 December 1813. In 1821 he was created Baron Silchester, of Silchester in the County of Southampton, in the Peerage of the United Kingdom, which gave him and his descendants an automatic seat in the House of Lords. He used his influence to strongly, but unsuccessfully, oppose Catholic Emancipation. This led him to clash publicly with his brother-in-law Wellington, a convert to Emancipation who as Prime Minister steered the measure through Parliament.

Family
Lord Longford remodelled the 17th-century Pakenham Hall in the Gothic Revival style in the early 1800s, adding towers and a moat. It was by then larger than any other castellated house in Ireland. In the family circle he was known for his fund of amusing stories.

He married Lady Georgiana Emma Charlotte Lygon, daughter of William Lygon, 1st Earl Beauchamp, in 1817. They had several children. Their third son, the Honourable Thomas Alexander Pakenham, was a rear-admiral in the Royal Navy and the father of Admiral Sir William Pakenham. Their seventh and youngest son, the Honourable Sir Francis Pakenham, was a diplomat and notably served as Ambassador to Sweden. Their daughter, Lady Georgiana Sophia Pakenham, married William Cecil, 3rd Marquess of Exeter.

Longford died in May 1835, aged 61, and was succeeded in the earldom by his eldest son, Edward. Longford's second son, William, who eventually succeeded his brother to the earldom, was a general in the British Army. The Countess of Longford survived her husband by over 40 years and died in February 1880.

References

External links

1774 births
1835 deaths
Irish representative peers
Knights of St Patrick
Thomas
Members of the Irish House of Lords
2
Peers of the United Kingdom created by George IV